Cardigan Mountain School, also called Cardigan or CMS, for short, is an all-boys independent boarding school for grades six through nine, located on 62 Alumni Drive, Canaan, New Hampshire, United States. It was founded in 1945 on land provided by Dartmouth College.

It is a member of the National Association of Independent Schools (NAIS), the Association of Boarding Schools (TABS), the Junior Boarding Schools Association (JBSA), and the Independent Schools Association of Northern New England (ISANNE).  It is accredited by the New England Association of Schools and Colleges (NEASC).

History
Cardigan Mountain School was founded in 1945 by a group of men with a vision for an educational program tailored to the needs of boys in the pre-preparatory school years.  The founders were prominent New England educators, businessmen, and civic leaders, including Ernest Martin Hopkins (president of Dartmouth College), William R. Brewster (headmaster of Kimball Union Academy), and Ralph Flanders (a U.S. senator from Vermont).  Land for the school's campus had originally been donated to Dartmouth College by the Haffenreffer family.  The founders believed the location to be ideal for a boys' school:  the land and Haffenreffer mansion, which initially housed classrooms and a dormitory and is now called Clark-Morgan Hall, are situated on a peninsula in Canaan Street Lake with views of Mount Cardigan and the White Mountains to the east and the Green Mountains to the west.  The school opened in 1946 with an enrollment of 24 boys, and its growth was fueled by the merger of the Clark School of Hanover, New Hampshire into Cardigan in 1953.

Summer Session 

Cardigan Mountain School runs its Summer Session usually beginning in June and ending in August. Summer Session, unlike the academic year program, is coeducational and serves younger students (grades three through nine) for three- and six-week experiences that include academic enrichment classes in the morning, and summer-camp style activities for the rest of the day. A highlight of the summer's activities is a competition known as "Green and White" that runs throughout the Summer Session in which students are assigned to either the Green Team or the White Team to compete in an activity selected by the faculty on a Wednesday evening. The students will wear special (green or white) T-shirts on Green and White nights. In 2011, the Cardigan Outdoor Recreation Expeditions (C.O.R.E.)  program was added to its Summer Session offerings. C.O.R.E. participants experience week-long trips that may include hiking, camping, canoeing, kayaking, and outdoor education programming.

Facilities
The school has numerous dormitories and houses for boarding students and faculty.

Dormitories
Hayward 1 and 2 
Clark Morgan 
Brewster 1 and 2
Hinman 1 and 2
French 1 and 2 
McCusker 1 and 2

Houses
Franklin
Greenwood
Banks
Funnell
Dewar

Other buildings and facilities
The school's principal academic buildings are Hopkins, Bronfman (where science labs are located) and Stoddard (which houses the school's library and the Humann Theatre as well as classrooms).  Other facilities include the Cardigan Commons (which opened in May 2013), the school's chapel, the Hamilton Family Student Health Center, the Kenerson Athletic Center, the Wakely Center (includes the Turner Arena hockey rink and Johnson-Wakely Fitness Center and wrestling facility), the Charles C. Gates I.D.E.A. Shop (which includes a woodshop), athletic fields, tennis courts, mountain biking course, woods and trails, a sledding slope on Clancy Hill, and a boat house with a fleet of boats on Canaan Street Lake.  The school once maintained and ran a ski slope on property known as the Pinnacle, but it is no longer in use.  The school has an indoor hockey rink known as Turner Arena, located in the Wakely Center, which converts to four tennis courts in the spring.

Notable alumni
 Samuel S. Adams, president of the American Geological Institute, geology professor at the Colorado School of Mines, and president of Loon Mountain
 F. Lee Bailey, defense lawyer
 Mo Bamba, professional basketball player for the Los Angeles Lakers
 Gavin Bayreuther, professional ice hockey player
 Ken Bentsen, Jr., former congressman from Texas
 Franklin S. Billings, Jr., American politician and judge from Woodstock, Vermont
 Matthew Bronfman, businessman, entrepreneur, and philanthropist
 Taylor Chace, sledge hockey player who won gold medals in the 2010 Winter Paralympics and the 2014 Winter Paralympics
 P. J. Chesson, professional auto racing driver, including the Indianapolis 500
 Philippe Cousteau Jr., environmentalist and oceanographer
 Eric Douglas, comedian and actor
 James Georgopoulos, visual artist
 Ben Lovejoy, professional ice hockey player and first New Hampshire native to win the Stanley Cup
 Freddy Meyer, professional ice hockey player
 Rob Morrow, actor (known for his role as Joel Fleischman in Northern Exposure), writer, and director
 Deron Quint, professional ice hockey player
 Jimmy Sharrow, professional ice hockey player

References

Further reading
 "Bring a Broom" Time magazine article, December 30, 1946

External links

Profile at Privateschoolreview.com
Profile at Boardingschoolreview.com

Boarding schools in New Hampshire
Boys' schools in the United States
Private middle schools in New Hampshire
Schools in Grafton County, New Hampshire
School buildings completed in 1946